John Davis (born 30 June 1978) is a former New Zealand swimming representative. Alongside Trent Bray, Scott Cameron and Danyon Loader he was part of the bronze medal winning 4 by 200 metre freestyle relay team at the 1998 Commonwealth Games.

See also
 List of Commonwealth Games medallists in swimming (men)

References

1978 births
Living people
New Zealand male freestyle swimmers
Commonwealth Games bronze medallists for New Zealand
Swimmers at the 1998 Commonwealth Games
Commonwealth Games medallists in swimming
Medallists at the 1998 Commonwealth Games